Marshall is a town in Margibi County, Liberia. It borders the Atlantic Ocean. The Farmington River empties into the Atlantic Ocean near Marshall.

External links
 Marshall, Liberia Weather report from accuweather.com

References

Margibi County